Abdul Khaliq Hazara is a Pakistani politician in Hazara Town, Balochistan, Pakistan. He has been the Chairman of Hazara Democratic Party (HDP) since November 2010, and is a member of the Quetta city council.

Abdul Khaliq Hazara remained as councillor of Nazim and district Nazim of Quetta Balochistan.  He started serving his people in 1990, working for the rights of the Hazara Nation in Quetta, where they are in minority.
 He is elected minister in the provisional parliament of Balochistan in 2018 general election of Pakistan.

On 8 September 2018, he was inducted into the provincial Balochistan cabinet of Chief Minister Jam Kamal Khan as adviser.

See also 
Hazara Democratic Party
 List of Hazara people
 List of people from Quetta
Ahmed Ali Kohzad
Qadir Nayel

References 

Living people
Hazara people
Hazara politicians
Hazara Democratic Party politicians
Pakistani people of Hazara descent
Year of birth missing (living people)